The 1968–69 County Championship was the 27th season of the Liga IV, the fourth tier of the Romanian football league system. The champions of each county association play against one from a neighboring county in a play-off  to gain promotion to Divizia C.

Promotion play-off

First phase 
The matches was played on 22, 29 June and 2 July 1969.

Second phase 
The matches was played on 6, 13 and 16 July 1969.

County leagues

Arad County

Brașov County

Harghita County

Hunedoara County

Neamț County

Olt County

Prahova County

Sibiu County

See also 

 1968–69 Divizia A
 1968–69 Divizia B
 1968–69 Divizia C

References

 Anuarul fotbalului românesc (Romanian football yearbook) 1969–1971. — Federația Română de Fotbal, Editura Stadion, București, 1973.

External links
 

Liga IV seasons
4
Romania